Engine House No. 3 may refer to:
 Engine House No. 3 (Fort Wayne, Indiana)
 Cleveland Mine Engine House Number 3, a historic building in Ishpeming, Michigan
 Engine House No. 3 (Kalamazoo, Michigan)
 Engine House No. 3, Truck No. 2, an engine house in Hoboken, New Jersey
 Engine House No. 3 (Sandusky, Ohio)

See also
Engine House (disambiguation)